Saint-Vérand is a commune in the Saône-et-Loire department in the region of Bourgogne-Franche-Comté in eastern France.

Wine

After the Revolution of 1789, the commune decided on the name Saint Vérand with a "d" at the end, following an administrative error. Saint-Vérand and surrounding communes produce white Burgundy wine under the appellation Saint-Véran, using Saint-Vérands old spelling, without 'd'.

See also
Communes of the Saône-et-Loire department

References

Communes of Saône-et-Loire